Samuel Ross Cash (born November 13, 1950) is a retired American basketball player.

He played college basketball for the University of California, Riverside.

He was selected by the Cleveland Cavaliers in the 5th round (66th pick overall) of the 1972 NBA Draft.  He was also selected by The Floridians in the 1972 ABA Draft.  After the demise of the Floridians, the Memphis Pros acquired his rights in a dispersal draft.

Cash's American basketball career closed with him playing in seven games for the Memphis Tams during the 1972–73 American Basketball Association season.

References

External links

1950 births
Living people
American men's basketball players
Basketball players from California
Cleveland Cavaliers draft picks
Memphis Tams players
Miami Floridians draft picks
People from San Bernardino County, California
Power forwards (basketball)
UC Riverside Highlanders men's basketball players